Biser is a Bulgarian given name. Notable people with the name include:

Biser Ivanov (born 1973), Bulgarian footballer and coach
Biser Kirov (1942–2016), Bulgarian pop singer
Biser Mihaylov (born 1943), Bulgarian footballer

Bulgarian given names